Ding Haifeng (born 17 July 1991) is a Chinese footballer who currently plays for Hebei China Fortune in the Chinese Super League.

Club career
Ding Haifeng started his football career playing Beijing Guoan's youth academy in 2006. He was then loaned to S.League side Beijing Guoan Talent during the 2010 season. He made his debut for the club on 23 June 2010 in a 2-1 loss against Singapore Armed Forces FC on 23 June 2010. Ding returned to Beijing Guoan during the 2011 season and he was subsequently promoted to the club's first team. On 29 February 2012, Ding transferred to China League One side Shenzhen Ruby after failing to establish himself within the team. He made his debut for the club on 17 March 2012 in a 1-0 win against Beijing Baxy.

On 28 February 2014, Ding transferred to Chinese Super League side Liaoning Whowin. He made his league debut for Liaoning on 20 April 2014 in a game against Tianjin Teda, coming on as a substitute for James Chamanga in the 24th minute. The following season, he would establish himself as the club's first choice left back within the team and on 24 May 2015 he would score his first goal for the club in a league game against Chongqing Lifan F.C. in a 1-1 draw.

On 6 January 2016, Ding transferred to Super League newcomer Hebei China Fortune. He made his debut for the club on 4 March 2016 in a 2-1 win against Guangzhou R&F.

On 22 February 2018, Ding transferred to fellow Super League side Guangzhou R&F with a five-year contract.

International career
Ding made his debut for the Chinese national team on 3 June 2016 in a 4-2 win against Trinidad and Tobago.

Career statistics 
.

References

External links

1991 births
Living people
Chinese footballers
Footballers from Hebei
Beijing Guoan F.C. players
Shenzhen F.C. players
Liaoning F.C. players
Hebei F.C. players
Guangzhou City F.C. players
Singapore Premier League players
Chinese Super League players
China League One players
Association football midfielders
China international footballers
Expatriate footballers in Singapore